The 2013–14 Oregon Ducks men's basketball team represents the University of Oregon during the 2013–14 NCAA Division I men's basketball season. The Ducks, led by their fourth year head coach Dana Altman, are members of the Pac-12 Conference and play their home games at Matthew Knight Arena.

Departures

Incoming transfers

Recruiting class

Roster

Depth chart

Schedule
 
|-
!colspan=12 style="background:#004F27; color:yellow;"| Exhibition

|-
!colspan=12 style="background:#004F27; color:yellow;"| Non-conference regular season

|-
!colspan=12 style="background:#004F27;"| Pac-12 regular season

|-
!colspan=12 style="background:#004F27;"| Pac-12 tournament

|-
!colspan=12 style="background:#004F27;"|  NCAA tournament

See also
2013–14 Oregon Ducks women's basketball team

Notes
 April 12, 2014 – Guard A.J. Lapray and forward  Ben Carter will transfer

Rankings

References

Oregon Ducks men's basketball seasons
Oregon
Oregon
Oregon
Oregon